Shekha Nath Adhikari is a member of the 2nd Nepalese Constituent Assembly. He won the Chitwan–2 seat in 2013 Nepalese Constituent Assembly election from the Nepali Congress.

References

Year of birth missing (living people)
Living people
Nepali Congress politicians from Bagmati Province
Members of the 2nd Nepalese Constituent Assembly